Teak (Tectona grandis) is a tropical hardwood tree species in the family Lamiaceae. It is a large, deciduous tree that occurs in mixed hardwood forests. Tectona grandis has small, fragrant white flowers arranged in dense clusters (panicles) at the end of the branches. These flowers contain both types of reproductive organs (perfect flowers). The large, papery leaves of teak trees are often hairy on the lower surface. Teak wood has a leather-like smell when it is freshly milled and is particularly valued for its durability and water resistance. The wood is used for boat building, exterior construction, veneer, furniture, carving, turnings, and other small wood projects.

Tectona grandis is native to south and southeast Asia, mainly Bangladesh, India, Indonesia, Malaysia, Myanmar, Thailand and Sri Lanka, but is naturalised and cultivated in many countries in Africa and the Caribbean. Myanmar's teak forests account for nearly half of the world's naturally occurring teak. Molecular studies show that there are two centres of genetic origin of teak: one in India and the other in Myanmar and Laos.

Description 

Leaf margins are entire.

The corolla tube is 2.5–3 mm long with 2 mm wide obtuse lobes. Tectona grandis sets fruit from September to December; fruits are globose and 1.2–1.8 cm in diameter. Flowers are weakly protandrous in that the anthers precede the stigma in maturity and pollen is shed within a few hours of the flower opening. The flowers are primarily entomophilous (insect pollinated), but can occasionally be anemophilous (wind pollinated). A 1996 study found that in its native range in Thailand, the major pollinator were species in the bee genus Ceratina.

Wood
 Heartwood is yellowish to golden-brown. It darkens as it ages. There can be a large variation based on which region the Teak is from. Old growth has much tighter rings than new growth. There is a leather-like scent in newly cut wood.
 Sapwood is whitish to pale yellowish brown. It can easily separate from heartwood.
 Wood texture is hard and ring porous.
 Density varies according to moisture content: at 15% moisture content it is 660 kg/m.

Botanical history 
Tectona grandis was first formally described by Carl Linnaeus the Younger in his 1782 work Supplementum Plantarum. In 1975, Harold Norman Moldenke published new descriptions of four forms of this species in the journal Phytologia. Moldenke described each form as varying slightly from the type specimen: T. grandis f. canescens is distinguished from the type material by being densely canescent, or covered in hairs, on the underside of the leaf, T. grandis f. pilosula is distinct from the type material in the varying morphology of the leaf veins, T. grandis f. punctata is only hairy on the larger veins on the underside of the leaf, and T. grandis f. tomentella is noted for its dense yellowish tomentose hairs on the lower surface of the leaf.

Etymology
The English word teak comes via the Portuguese  from Malayalam  (cognate with Tamil , Telugu , and Kannada ) via Sanskrit "shaka" and "saka". Central Province teak and Nagpur teak are named for those regions of India.

Distribution and habitat 
Tectona grandis is one of three species in the genus Tectona. The other two species, T. hamiltoniana and T. philippinensis, are endemics with relatively small native distributions in Myanmar and the Philippines, respectively. Tectona grandis is native to India, Bangladesh, Sri Lanka, Indonesia, Myanmar, northern Thailand, and northwestern Laos.

Tectona grandis is found in a variety of habitats and climatic conditions from arid areas with only 500 mm of rain per year to very moist forests with up to 5,000 mm of rain per year. Typically, though, the annual rainfall in areas where teak grows averages 1,250–1,650 mm with a 3–5 month dry season.

Cultivation 
Teak's natural oils make it useful in exposed locations, and make the timber termite- and pest-resistant.  Teak is durable even when not treated with oil or varnish. Timber cut from old teak trees was once believed to be more durable and harder than plantation-grown teak. Studies have shown that plantation teak performs on par with old-growth teak in erosion rate, dimensional stability, warping, and surface checking, but is more susceptible to colour change from UV exposure.

The vast majority of commercially harvested teak is grown on teak plantations found in Indonesia and controlled by Perum Perhutani (a state owned forest enterprise) that manages the country's forests. The primary use of teak harvested in Indonesia is in the production of outdoor teak furniture for export. Nilambur in Kerala, India, is also a major producer of teak, and is home to the world's oldest teak plantation.

Teak consumption raises a number of environmental concerns, such as the disappearance of rare old-growth teak. However, its popularity has led to growth in sustainable plantation teak production throughout the seasonally dry tropics in forestry plantations. The Forest Stewardship Council offers certification of sustainably grown and harvested teak products. Propagation of teak via tissue culture for plantation purposes is commercially viable.

Teak plantations were widely established in Equatorial Africa during the Colonial era. These timber resources, as well as the oil reserves, are at the heart of the current (2014) South Sudanese conflict.

Much of the world's teak is exported by Indonesia and Myanmar. There is also a rapidly growing plantation grown market in Central America (Costa Rica) and South America. With a depletion of remaining natural hectares of teak forests, a growth in plantations in Latin America is expected to rise.

Hyblaea puera, commonly known as the teak defoliator, is a moth native to southeast Asia. It is a teak pest whose caterpillar feeds on teak and other species of trees common in the region of southeast Asia.

Uses 
Teak's high oil content, high tensile strength and tight grain make it particularly suitable where weather resistance is desired. It is used in the manufacture of outdoor furniture and boat decks.  It is also used for cutting boards, indoor flooring, countertops and as a veneer for indoor finishings. Although easily worked, it can cause severe blunting on edged tools because of the presence of silica in the wood.  Over time teak can weather to a silvery-grey finish, especially when exposed to sunlight.

Teak is used extensively in India to make doors and window frames, furniture, and columns and beams in homes. It is resistant to termite attacks and damage caused by other insects. Mature teak fetches a very good price. It is grown extensively by forest departments of different states in forest areas.

Leaves of the teak wood tree are used in making Pellakai gatti (jackfruit dumpling), where batter is poured into a teak leaf and is steamed. This type of usage is found in the coastal district of Udupi in the Tulunadu region in South India. The leaves are also used in gudeg, a dish of young jackfruit made in Central Java, Indonesia, and give the dish its dark brown colour.

Teak is used as a food plant by the larvae of moths of the genus Endoclita including E. aroura, E. chalybeatus, E. damor, E. gmelina, E. malabaricus, E. sericeus and E. signifer and other Lepidoptera including the turnip moth.

Boatbuilding 

Teak has been used as a boat-building material for over 2000 years (it was found in an archaeological dig in Berenice Panchrysos, a port on the Indian Roman trade route). In addition to relatively high strength, teak is also highly resistant to rot, fungi and mildew. The wood has a relatively low shrinkage ratio, which makes it excellent for applications where it undergoes periodic changes in moisture. Teak has the unusual property of being both an excellent structural timber for framing or planking, while at the same time being easily worked and finished, unlike some otherwise similar woods such as purpleheart. For this reason, it is also prized for the trim work on boat interiors. Due to the oily nature of the wood, care must be taken to properly prepare the wood before gluing.

When used on boats, teak is also very flexible in the finishes that may be applied. One option is to use no finish at all, in which case the wood will naturally weather to a pleasing silver grey. The wood may also be oiled with a finishing agent such as linseed or tung oil. This results in a pleasant, somewhat dull finish. Finally, teak may also be varnished for a deep, lustrous glow.

Teak is also used extensively in boat decks, as it is extremely durable and requires very little maintenance.  The teak tends to wear in to the softer 'summer' growth bands first, forming a natural 'non-slip' surface. Any sanding is therefore only damaging. Use of modern cleaning compounds, oils or preservatives will shorten the life of the teak, as it contains natural teak oil a very small distance below the white surface. Wooden boat experts will only wash the teak with salt water, and re-caulk when needed. This cleans the deck, and prevents it from drying out and the wood shrinking. The salt helps it absorb and retain moisture, and prevents any mildew and algal growth. Over-maintenance, such as cleaning teak with harsh chemicals, can shorten its usable lifespan as decking.

Propagation

Teak is propagated mainly from seeds. Germination of the seeds involves pretreatment to remove dormancy arising from the thick pericarp. Pretreatment involves alternate wetting and drying of the seed. The seeds are soaked in water for 12 hours and then spread to dry in the sun for 12 hours. This is repeated for 10–14 days and then the seeds are sown in shallow germination beds of coarse peat covered by sand. The seeds then germinate after 15 to 30 days.

Clonal propagation of teak has been successfully done through grafting, rooted stem cuttings and micro propagation. While bud grafting on to seedling root stock has been the method used for establishing clonal seed orchards that enables assemblage of clones of the superior trees to encourage crossing, rooted stem cuttings and micro propagated plants are being increasingly used around the world for raising clonal plantations.

World's largest living teak tree 

Ministry of Environmental Conservation and Forestry (Myanmar) found the world's two biggest living teak trees on 28 August 2017 in Homalin Township, Sagaing Region, Myanmar.

Previously, the world's biggest recorded teak tree was located within the Parambikulam Wildlife Sanctuary in the Palakkad District of Kerala in India, named Kannimara. Its age is between 450–500 years and is considered one of the oldest teak trees in the world.

A teak tree in Kappayam, Edamalayar, Kerala, which used to be considered the biggest, has a girth of only 7.23 meters.

Tree No 23 is the oldest planted teak on earth. It is located in Conolly's plot (the world’s oldest teak plantation), Nilambur, Kerala.

References

External links 

 

U.S. Forest Products Lab: USDA Forest Service 

Teak
Plants described in 1782
Tectona grandis
Tectona grandis
Tectona grandis
Tectona grandis
Wood
Forestry in Indonesia
Forestry in Myanmar
Plant dyes